Turley Richards (born Richard Turley, June 12, 1941) is an American singer and guitarist.

Richards was born in Charleston, West Virginia, United States. He was blinded in the left eye at the age of four in an archery accident and lost sight in the right eye as well at the age of twenty-nine. He began playing in a group called The Five Pearls while still a teen in the 1950s. His first appearance on record was in 1959, a single titled "All About Ann", released on label Fraternity Records. "Makin' Love With My Baby", also released by Fraternity Records, followed later that year. Richards is listed in the Rockabilly Hall of Fame as a Rockabilly Legend for this song.

He moved to Los Angeles with an ensemble in the early 1960s, but his band failed and he returned to West Virginia. Later in the 1960s he moved to New York City. He played the uptown East Side local Bar's (Malachy's II) and eventually found success. He released his debut album on Warner Bros. Records in 1970. He scored two minor hit singles in the early 1970s. Further releases followed later in the decade, as did a third hit in 1980.

Richards made the first recording of Tom Snow and Nan O'Byrne's "You Might Need Somebody", which was subsequently a UK hit twice, reaching number 11 for Randy Crawford in 1981 and number 4 for Shola Ama in 1997.

Discography

Albums
1965 - The Many Souls of Turley Richards (20th Century Fox)
1970 - Turley Richards (Warner Bros.)
1971 - Expressions (Warner Bros.)
1972 - From Darkness to Light (Silba) - solo concert, rare release
1973 - Because I Am (Clearlight Productions) - featuring one song
1976 - West Virginia Superstar (Epic)
1979 - Therfu (Atlantic)
2007 - A Matter of Faith (Kiongazi Music)
2007 - Back to My Roots (Kiongazi Music)
2008 - Blindsighted (Kiongazi Music)

Singles
1959 - "All About Ann" / "Makin' Love with My Baby" (Fraternity)
1959 - "I Wanna Dance" / "Since I Met You" (Fraternity)
1964 - "Since You Been Gone" / "What's Your Name" (MGM)
1966 - "Crazy Arms" / "I Just Can't Take It Any Longer" (Columbia)
1966 - "I Feel Alright" / "I Can't Get Back Home to My Baby" (Columbia)
1978 - "Under the Boardwalk" (Epic)
1984 - "Skin Fever" (Vitag Records)

Charting singles
"I Heard the Voice of Jesus" (1970) - US #99
"Love Minus Zero/No Limit" (1970) - US #84, AUS #96
"Child of Mine" (1970) - AUS #83
"You Might Need Somebody" (1980) - US #54

References

External links
Official website

Singers from West Virginia
American male singers
Musicians from Charleston, West Virginia
Living people
Blind musicians
1941 births
The Kingsmen members